John Anthony Dyson, Lord Dyson,  (born 31 July 1943) is a former British judge and barrister. He was Master of the Rolls and Head of Civil Justice, the second most senior judge in England and Wales, from 2012 to 2016, and a Justice of the Supreme Court of the United Kingdom from 2010 to 2012. He was the first justice to be appointed who was not a peer.

Early life
Dyson has an East European Jewish heritage. His mother was Bulgarian and his paternal grandparents Lithuanian. He was born in Yorkshire and educated at Leeds Grammar School.  He studied the piano with Dame Fanny Waterman.  He then studied classics at Wadham College, Oxford. He was called to the Bar at the Middle Temple in 1968.

Legal career 
Dyson took silk in 1982 and was appointed a Recorder in 1986. He became a bencher of Middle Temple Inn in 1990. He was the head of 39 Essex Chambers from 1986 to 1993.

He was appointed to the Bench of the High Court on 30 March 1993, sitting in the Queen's Bench Division, and received a knighthood. In 1994, he was appointed chairman of the Equal Treatment Advisory Committee of the Judicial College. In 1998, he became presiding judge of the Technology and Construction Court, a specialist part of the Queen's Bench Division.

On 11 January 2001, Dyson was appointed a Lord Justice of Appeal, a judge of the Court of Appeal of England and Wales, in succession to Lord Justice Nourse, and was appointed to the Privy Council. In 2003, he was promoted to Deputy Head of Civil Justice.

Dyson was appointed a Justice of the Supreme Court of the United Kingdom with effect from 12 April 2010, and was sworn in on 19 April. His appointment brought the Supreme Court up to full strength by filling a vacancy that had existed since the court began work in October 2009. On appointment, he became the fourth Jewish judge of the 12 Supreme Court justices, alongside Lord Brown, Lord Collins and Lord Phillips.

It was announced in December 2010 that, by Royal Warrant, all members of the Supreme Court, even if they did not hold a peerage, were entitled to the judicial courtesy title of "Lord" for life. Dyson was the first Supreme Court Justice to whom this applied, and he gained the courtesy title Lord Dyson.

According to Standpoint, he was said to have come a "close second" to Lord Neuberger of Abbotsbury to succeed Lord Clarke of Stone-cum-Ebony as Master of the Rolls in 2009. In the event, Dyson was appointed Master of the Rolls with effect from 1 October 2012 as was widely expected following the announcement of Neuberger's appointment (also with effect from 1 October) as President of the Supreme Court of the United Kingdom in July 2012. From 2012 to 2016, he was Chairman of the Magna Carta Trust and of the Advisory Council to the Secretary of State for Culture, Media and Sport on National Records and Archives. He was chairman of the British Friends of the Hebrew University's legal group.

Dyson retired and was replaced by Sir Terence Etherton as Master of the Rolls on 3 October 2016. He was Treasurer of Middle Temple for 2017. He has returned to 39 Essex Chambers to practise as an arbitrator and mediator.

Affiliations 
In 2013, Dyson was awarded honorary degrees of LLD by Essex University and University College, London. In 2014, he was awarded an honorary degree of LLD by Leeds University.

He is a visiting professor of law at Queen Mary, London and University College, London.

He is an honorary fellow of Wadham College, Oxford and the Hebrew University, Jerusalem.

Personal life 
He has been married to Jacqueline Levy since 1970. They have a daughter and a son. He has said that being Jewish is a core part of his identity.

References

1943 births
Living people
People educated at Leeds Grammar School
Alumni of Wadham College, Oxford
Judges of the Supreme Court of the United Kingdom
Knights Bachelor
Masters of the Rolls
Members of the Privy Council of the United Kingdom